Doug Gatewood (November 16, 1955) Democratic served as a member of the Kansas House of Representatives, representing the 1st district from 1999-2012.  First elected to the House in 1998, he has previously served as mayor and city council member in Columbus and city council in Galena, Ks.

Governor Kathleen Sebelius appointed Gatewood to serve on the Kansas Technology Enterprise Corporation, which encourages technology based economic development. Additionally, he has been a small business owner for over 30 years and has also been active in the local Chamber of Commerce and the Lions Club.

References

External links
 Kansas Legislature - Doug Gatewood
 Project Vote Smart profile
 Kansas Votes profile
 Kansas House Democrats profile

Democratic Party members of the Kansas House of Representatives
Living people
People from Columbus, Kansas
1955 births
20th-century American politicians
21st-century American politicians